Marius Dumitru Corbu (born 7 May 2002) is a Romanian professional footballer who plays as an attacking midfielder or a forward for Nemzeti Bajnokság I club Puskás Akadémia.

Club career
Corbu made his Nemzeti Bajnokság I debut for Puskás Akadémia in a 3–2 home win over Újpest, on 30 August 2020.

Career statistics

Club

References

External links

2002 births
Living people
People from Bacău County
Romanian footballers
Association football midfielders
Association football forwards
Liga II players
FK Csíkszereda Miercurea Ciuc players
Nemzeti Bajnokság I players
Nemzeti Bajnokság II players
Csákvári TK players
Puskás Akadémia FC players
Romania youth international footballers
Romania under-21 international footballers
Romanian expatriate footballers
Expatriate footballers in Hungary
Romanian expatriate sportspeople in Hungary